Current Eye Research is a medical journal covering all areas of ophthalmology. Areas covered include: clinical research, anatomy, physiology, biophysics, biochemistry, pharmacology, developmental biology, microbiology, and immunology

Editors 
The editors-in-chief of Current Eye Research are Gerd Geerling (University of Duesseldorf, Germany) and Robert Linsenmeier  (Northwestern University, United States).

Impact factor 

According to the 2015 Journal Citation Reports, the journal's impact factor is 2.025, ranking it 22nd out of 56 journals in the category (Updated Year: 2015) "Ophthalmology".

References

External links

Publications established in 1981
Ophthalmology journals
Taylor & Francis academic journals
Monthly journals
English-language journals